Ovatipsa is a genus of sea snails, marine gastropod mollusks in the family Cypraeidae, the cowries.

Species
Species within the genus Ovatipsa include:
Ovatipsa chinensis (Gmelin, 1791)
Ovatipsa coloba (Melvill, 1888)
Ovatipsa rashleighana (Melvill, 1888)

References

Cypraeidae